Bogdanovo (Boğźan) is a rural locality (a selo) in Bogdanovsky Selsoviet, Baltachevsky District, Bashkortostan, Russia. The population was 454 as of 2010. There are 10 streets.

Geography 
Bogdanovo is located 26 km southeast of Starobaltachevo (the district's administrative centre) by road. Starotimkino is the nearest rural locality.

References 

Rural localities in Baltachevsky District